The Brda is a river in northern Poland, a tributary of the Vistula. It has a total length of 245 km and a catchment area (all within Poland) of 4,665 km2.

Navigation
The Brda is part of the Odra-Vistula waterway, connecting these two rivers via the Warta and Noteć Rivers and the Bydgoszcz Canal
since end of the 18th century. The waterway is navigable for modest barges (of CEMT Class II) but with a limited draught.

With the expansion of the European Union to the East, the waterway could play an important role. It is a link in the much longer connection with Eastern Europe via the Vistula, Narew, Bug, Mukhavets, Pripyat, and Dnieper Rivers, but this connection remains unnavigable due to a dam near Brest, Belarus.

Currently, only limited numbers of vessels use the Brda River and the adjacent canal
(however, the traffic was significantly larger from 1950s to 1970s, then diminishing step by step as time went by). It is expected that the waterway will be discovered by leisure boaters in the future. (Source:  NoorderSoft Waterways Database)

Tourism
Brda is one of the most beautiful kayak routes in Poland. The trail is 233 km long, and it goes through forests, lakes and fields.

Towns and townships on Brda
 Przechlewo
 Konarzyny
 Tuchola
 Koronowo
 Bydgoszcz

See also
List of rivers of Poland

References

Rivers of Poland
Rivers of Pomeranian Voivodeship
Rivers of Kuyavian-Pomeranian Voivodeship